Tehran XI was an Iranian football club founded in 1926 from Tehran that was seen as the predecessor of the Iran's national football team. The players were chosen from Tehran Club, Toofan Club and Armenian Sports Club.

History

In 1926 Tehran XI (selected players from Tehran Club, Toofan Club and Armenian Sports Club)
traveled across the border to Baku, USSR, this was the first away football match for an Iranian team. This Tehran Select team is the predecessor of Iran's national football team.

In 1929 it was time for a return visit, and so a team from Baku was invited to play in Tehran in late November. To impress the visitors, grass had been planted on the state-owned football field. The last of the three games, all of which were won by the visitors, was attended by Abdolhossein Teymourtash, the powerful minister of court. The humiliating defeats, suffered on home ground, caused great consternation, so much so that some young men gave up football altogether. In subsequent years the interest in football waned, and newspapers hardly reported on those matches that did take place. However, all this changed with the return of crown prince Mohammad Reza Pahlavi from Switzerland in 1936 and the arrival of Thomas R. Gibson in the 1930s to promote the game.

Squad
Head Coach:  Mir Mehdi Varzandeh

Squad

Results
The results were as follow:

References

Defunct football clubs in Iran